Song Wenfei (30 May 1985 – 3 March 2013), also known as "Song Wenting" or "Vionn Song", was a Chinese actress. She is famous for her major role in the TV series Dancer by the famous Chinese writer Haiyan. She died of uterine cancer on 3 March 2013.

Filmography
 Dancer (2008)
 In that Distant Place (2009)
 Growing Through Life (2010)
 Princess Show (2013)

References

1985 births
2013 deaths
Actresses from Guangzhou
Actresses from Guangdong
Chinese film actresses
Chinese television actresses